The third series of My Kitchen Rules was an Australian reality television cooking programme which aired on the Seven Network.

Following the ratings success of the second series, the Seven Network announced the show was renewed for a third season. The third season of My Kitchen Rules started on 30 January 2012. For the first time, a team from New Zealand took part in the show.

Game variations
 This season, there would be twelve teams, two teams from Queensland, New South Wales, Victoria, South Australia, and Western Australia. Only one team from Tasmania (last season had two), and one from New Zealand (show's first).
 Instant Restaurant Elimination Round - the three lowest scoring teams from each group would take part in this round and the lowest scoring team would be eliminated (similar to the first season).
 The prize money for this season and all future seasons increased to AU$250,000.

Teams

Elimination history

 Note:
 – In Round 3 after winning the peoples choice, David & Scott won immunity for the rest of the week and a holiday in Far North Queensland, Pete & Manu stated that they could pick one team to join them on the holiday, also granting that team immunity, they chose Nic & Rocco.

Competition details

Instant Restaurants
During the Instant Restaurant rounds, each team hosts a three-course dinner for judges and fellow teams in their allocated group. They are scored and ranked among their group. After all six teams from the first group had been assessed, it was revealed that the three teams who scored the lowest in each group would be facing elimination. After all six teams from the second group had been assessed, it was revealed that the teams who were facing elimination had to do another round of instant restaurant. After all six teams involved had been assessed, the team who scored the lowest would be eliminated from the competition.

Round 1
 Episodes 1 to 6
 Airdate — 30 January to 7 February
 Description — The first of the two instant restaurant groups are introduced into the competition in Round 1. The three lowest scoring teams at the end of this round go into the elimination round.

Round 2
 Episodes 7 to 12
 Airdate — 8 to 16 February
 Description — The second group now start their Instant Restaurant round. The same rules from the previous round apply and the three lowest scoring teams go into the elimination round.

Round 3
 Episodes 13 to 18
 Airdate — 20 February to 28 February
 Description — The bottom three teams from each instant restaurant group compete against each other in Round 3. The lowest scoring team at the end of this round is eliminated.

Top 11

People's Choice Challenge: Bed & Breakfast
 Episode 19
 Airdate – 29 February 2012
 Description – For the First People's Choice Challenge, the teams took over Bed and Breakfast and are headed to the Blue Mountains. Each team cooked in different Bed and Breakfast kitchens. For this first round Meg and Simon were immune from elimination due to coming first in the third round of instant restaurant and thus not taking part in the challenge. They served to the B&B owners, their families. They had 1 and a half hours to cook for 50 guests and each voted for their favorite dish. Whoever got the most votes would join Meg and Simon in the safety zone and Manu and Pete would choose the worst dish and they would go to an elimination sudden death cook-off. The teams had 15 minutes to get all their ingredients for their dish in a local supermarket.

Kitchen Cook Off
 Episode 20
 Airdate – 1 March 2012
 Description – For the Kitchen Cook off, teams were fighting it out to see who would go against Thomas and Carla in the sudden death elimination challenge. Simon and Meg along with Emily and Carly served as diners as they were already safe, while Thomas and Carla were waiting to see who they would face in the sudden death cook-off. The eight remaining teams would be in a rapid fire cook off where they would have 30 minutes  at the end of the rapid fire – 4 would be safe and 4 would not and had to cook in a showdown to see who would go head to head with Thomas and Carla. The key ingredient for the Rapid Cook Off was chicken and how they cook the chicken was predetermined by what bench they chose. Under each bench was a piece of equipment they must use and hell was breaking loose. However, the teams had a minute to switch equipments, but no teams switch equipments. For the Showdown, the new ingredients were salt and pepper. Salt or pepper had to play a critical role in the flavour of the team's dish and they had one hour to finish their dish.

Sudden Death
 Episode 21
 Airdate – 5 March 2012
 Description – After the Sudden Death, a second team would be eliminated with Thomas & Carla would face off against NSW’s team Sam & Jillian in the sudden death cook off. The two teams were told that they would serve not only Pete and Manu but as well as the guest judges which were composed of Guy Grossi, Tobie Puttock, Karen Martini and Liz Egan. The teams would be serving a three course meal of Entree, Main and Dessert. After serving three courses each judge would give a score out of 10. They had one and a half hours to serve their entree, an hour before serving their main and 30 minutes before dessert.

Top 10

People's Choice Challenge: Melbourne Cook-off
 Episode 22
 Airdate – 6 March 2012
 Description – For the second People's Choice Challenge, they would be cooking in the industrial kitchen, before selling their food on the streets through spruiking. The team who makes the most money would be the people’s choice and would be safe however if the judges deem your food as the worst, they would be sent into the sudden death cook-off. They had an hour and a half to cook their food. The teams would then be selling their dish in a ‘Pop up’ food stalls ‘on wheels’. They would have an hour to sell in the streets. Pete and Manu then announced that there was only a $20 difference between first and second place. The two top scoring teams were Steve & Helen and Carly & Emily, with Steve & Helen coming on top with $348 and winning the people's choice.

Kitchen Cook-off
 Episode 23
 Airdate – 7 March 2012
 Description – In the Rapid Cook-off, the 8 remaining teams had to cook at Kitchen Headquarters to decide who would join Peter & Gary in the next sudden death cook-off. The teams would have 30 minutes to cook with the 4 weakest dishes heading to the showdown and only one team member can cook. However, for the second twist, the ones who chose the ingredients would be the decision maker as the other would be the cook, they were then told to swap. Their challenge for the showdown was to make a dish that represented what they mean to the competition and they only had one hour to make it.

Sudden Death
 Episode 24
 Airdate – 8 March 2012
 Description – For the sudden death, it would be rivals Peter & Gary and Carly & Emily where one would be eliminated after the cook-off. The two teams rivalry began at the Instant Restaurant round where Peter & Gary felt that they deserved to be in the top 3 over Carly & Emily. Peter thinks that the girls will do anything to win this competition. Emily then replied "Our young age is on our side because we are speedy, we can run around like no one’s business", with a reply from Peter "Your young age which equates to me as inexperience". Carly then said "We will find out today". Peter & Gary scored the lowest score in MKR history.

Top 9

People's Choice Challenge: North Queensland Festival
 Episode 25
 Airdate – 11 March 2012
 Description – For this week the teams headed to Tropical North Queensland. The remaining teams find themselves in Ingham, a small quintessential sugar cane town. Their challenge was to create sweet treats for the town’s annual Harvest Festival using an ingredient the locals known best sugar. The locals would vote for their favourite sweet treat and would be awarded People’s Choice and be safe at the next elimination, while Manu and Pete would decide the day’s worse dish and would head to sudden death. The winners would also receive a very special surprise reward of handing another team immunity. They had one and a half hours and great Queensland produce.

Camper Kitchen Cook Off
 Episode 26
 Airdate – 12 March 2012
 Description – In this Rapid Cook-off, the teams would be racing for their ingredients, teams had to cook on makeshift camp kitchens. Their guests tonight were people who knew camp cooking better than anyone. At Port Douglas the teams embarked on an Amazing Race style challenge to source the best ingredients the quickest and get to their campsite first. The first three teams to arrive would cook mains and the last three would do desserts. The weakest team would go sudden death against Megan and Andy.

Sudden Death
 Episode 27
 Airdate – 13 March 2012
 Description – The contestants rock up to a poolside meeting with the judges. Pete introduces the team to the Mission Beach, before Manu debriefs on the challenge ahead. They had to cook the best three course meal, tropical style, using ingredients that symbolize North East Queensland. The key ingredients they had to use were Moreton Bay Bugs, Macadamia Nuts and Mango. They could use the ingredients however they like, but they had to shine through at least one of their courses. They had one and a half hours before the entrees had to be on the tables.

Top 8

People's Choice Challenge: Seafood Platter Meal
 Episode 28
 Airdate – 14 March 2012
 Description – For the first time the teams were cooking at Kitchen HQ for the People's Choice Challenge. The judges announced that since Easter was just around the corner, the theme for their dishes was Easter. They had to create an Easter-themed banquet with seafood. The teams would be cooking for 40 VIP’s. The winners would be immune from elimination while the weakest dish chose by Pete and Manu would be thrown straight into sudden death cook-off. They would all have an hour and a half to prepare their dishes. They all head to off for a fifteen-minute shopping run to ‘create’ their dishes. The VIP's were the friends and family of the teams. The teams would be the one voting for each other and deciding the People's Choice

Sudden Death
 Episode 30
 Airdate – 18 March 2012
 Description – National pride was on the line as Kiwi’s Meg and Simon went head to head against New South Wales brother and sister team Steve and Helen in the sudden death cook-off. The cook-off would be a Trans Tasman challenge – Australia vs New Zealand. The two teams were making a three dish course.

Elimination week
In the Elimination Week, The judges announced that one team would be eliminated from the competition every night until only four teams remained. The judges also revealed that they were not the only one that the teams had to impress. In another surprise twist, the teams would face their harshest critics yet with the shock arrival of a jury. The teams are left dumbfounded when they see who came to dinner. The jury was composed of eliminated contestants. Manu and Pete revealed that the jury would determine one of the weakest teams while Pete and Manu would decide the other. The Jury would score each dish out of 10 as a team. The weakest team chosen by the Jury and the one chosen by Pete and Manu would head straight to a sudden death cook-off.

Round 1
 Episode 31
 Airdate – 19 March 2012
 Description – Pete and Manu announced that the key ingredient for the first round of the elimination week was found in every home in Australia. The key ingredient was meat mince, however the teams could  choose their type of meat mince whether it be chicken, lamb, veal, pork or the classic beef. The dishes for the teams were as follows

 Verdict – After the down-the-line Cook-off, the jury's verdict was that Angela & Justine was the weakest dish with a score of 12/50. Although the individual votes of jury wasn't revealed. Peter then revealed the reason why Angela & Justine was the weakest dish was that packet pasta and tasteless meatballs won’t cut it. Pete and Manu reveal that the team to go to the elimination cook off was Megan and Andy.

Round 2
 Episode 32
 Airdate – 20 March 2012
 Description – For the second round of elimination week, the key ingredient for the down-the-line cook-off was cheese. The teams similar to round 1 had a choice of what type of cheese they wanted to use. The dishes for the teams were as follows:

 Verdict – After the down-the-line cook-off. The jury's vote was first revealed and the jury chosen Leigh & Jennifer as the weakest team with a score of 13/60. Peter as the jury spokesperson, stated "We the jury find you guilty of not meeting the brief and laziness.” Leigh accused the jury of foul play stating "I wish people would just judge the food. Not because people have been doing well and they want to bring them down". Pete & Manu then selected their weakest dish as David & Scott's Seafood Mornay. Jennifer stated she doesn't want cook against them with both girls teared up after it was announced they were facing David & Scott.

Round 3
 Episode 33
 Airdate – 21 March 2012
 Description – For the third round of elimination week, the key ingredient for the all-line cook-off was citrus fruit. They could however choose whichever citrus fruit they want maybe like lime, lemon, etc. The dishes for the teams were as follows:

 Verdict – After the down-the-line cook-off. With a score of 42/70, the jury choose Andy & Megan as the weakest team. Pete & Manu then chose the team of Helen & Steve. With the nomination of the two teams, Nic & Rocco, Carly & Emily, and Leigh & Jennifer headed to the finals. As Helen & Steve and Andy & Megan fight it off in a sudden death cook-off for a place in the finals.

Semifinals

Kitchen Cook-off: Seeding Round
 Episode 34
 Airdate – 22 March 2012
 Description – The teams had to compete in 2 challenges and fight for point and be ranked 1 to 4 to see who would go head to head in the semi-finals. The 1st place would cook against 4th place, while 2nd would cook against 3rd. Manu and Pete would be the one giving points to each dish.

Round 1
 Description – The first test was a rapid cook off and would be their last and they only have 30 minutes The key ingredient was chosen by the jury and was chilli. Tonight only one person could cook each dish for 15 minutes and then swap – while the other was cooking, the partner could not watch what the other was making. Leigh, Nic, Megan, and Carly were the first ones to cook. While, Jennifer, Rocco, Andy, and Emily were the last ones to cook and were the one that was going to plate-up.

Round 2
 Description – After round 1 Carly & Emily took first place. For round 2, the only limit the teams were given was their own imagination. The dish needed to show their skills, techniques and capabilities in 1 and a half hours. After the end of the two rounds, Jennifer & Leigh came in first with 37 points and would be taking on Megan & Andy who came in fourth with 31 points for the first semifinal. In the second semifinal it would see Carly & Emily who came in second with 36 points taking on third place Nic & Rocco with 34 points.

Semifinal 1
 Episode 35
 Airdate – 25 March 2012
 Description – In the first semi-final it would be South Australia’s Princess and florist, Jennifer and Leigh taking on Tassies seafood superchef’s Megan and Andy. Whoever won tonight was through to the grand final, while we would say goodbye to the other team tonight. The challenge for the semifinals was to make the ultimate 3 course meal.

Semifinal 2
 Episode 36
 Airdate – 26 March 2012
 Description – In the second semifinal childhood mates Nic & Rocco took on siblings Carly & Emily. Where, the winner would take on Leigh & Jennifer for the My Kitchen Rules title. Like the 1st Semifinal teams had to cook the ultimate three course dish for the judge.

Grand final
 Episode 37
 Airdate – 27 March 2012
 Description – In the Grand Finale it was South Australia vs South Australia as Leigh & Jennifer took on Nic & Rocco. The final test for the South Australians' was faultless food. Each team had to cook 5 courses and produce 100 plates of food. The teams instant restaurant names were behind their respective benches – “Burlesque” for the girls and “Double Trouble” for the boys. The two teams had the eliminated teams and their love ones as diners. After the five courses, the judges scored the menu of each team, the highest scoring team was crowned the My Kitchen Rules 2012 champions and walked away with the $250,000 prize money.

Ratings
 Colour key:
  – Highest rating during the series
  – Lowest rating during the series
  – An elimination was held in this episode
  – Finals week

References

External links
Official site
Episodes

2012 Australian television seasons
My Kitchen Rules